On April 1, 1984, Marvin Gaye, an American musician who gained worldwide fame for his work with Motown Records, was shot and killed on the day before his 45th birthday by his father, Marvin Gay Sr., at their house in the Arlington Heights district of Los Angeles, California. Gaye was shot twice following an altercation with his father after he intervened in an argument between his parents. He was pronounced dead on arrival at the California Hospital Medical Center. His father later pleaded no contest to a charge of voluntary manslaughter. 

Gaye's death inspired several musical tributes over the years including recollections of the incidents leading to his death. Gaye was given a burial plot at Forest Lawn Cemetery, and was later cremated and his ashes spread around the Pacific Ocean.

Circumstances

Marvin Gaye had a bitter relationship with his father, Marvin Gay Sr., since his childhood. Marvin Sr. was a Christian minister who was a strict disciplinarian and often physically punished his children. He was also a crossdresser, which was widely known in the family's Washington, D.C., neighborhood and made the younger Marvin a target of bullying. It was because of this, added with rumors of Gaye's own homosexuality (and in tribute to one of Gaye's favorite singers, Sam Cooke), that he added an "e" to his last name when he became famous. Gaye's father never approved of his son's career in music, and gradually grew resentful that Gaye was closer to his mother, Alberta, and had become the breadwinner for the family. Despite a brief improvement in their relationship after Gaye found success with his album What's Going On, father and son never found any lasting peace.

By 1983, after a period as a European tax exile, Gaye had re-entered the public eye with the hit song "Sexual Healing" and its album, Midnight Love. For a time, he had also achieved sobriety during his extensive stay in Belgium. Returning to the U.S., he embarked on his final Sexual Healing Tour in April of that year. Gaye, who had a profound dislike for touring, returned to cocaine abuse to cope with the pressures of the road, and midway through the tour he developed paranoia over an alleged attempt on his life, wearing a bulletproof vest until he was on stage. 

When the tour ended in August 1983, Gaye returned to the U.S. to nurse his mother, who was recovering from kidney surgery, and moved into his parents' residence at 2101 South Gramercy Place, a home which he bought for them in 1973. During his stay, Gaye's father was absent. That October, his father returned from a business trip in Washington during which he purchased insurance on his family's previous residence. Initially, Gaye's sisters Jeanne and Zeola lived in the house before Marvin Sr. returned to the property, and left shortly afterwards due to the growing conflict between father and son. 

For the next six months, the two men struggled to keep their distance from one another. During one quarrel at the house, the elder Gay called police to have his son leave the property. After staying with one of his sisters, however, Gaye returned to the property stating to a friend of his, "After all, I have just one father. I want to make peace with him." Jeanne Gay later told David Ritz that her father had told her if Marvin ever touched him, he'd "kill him".

On Christmas Day 1983, Gaye gave his father a Smith & Wesson .38 Special pistol so that he could protect himself from intruders. Friends and family members contended that the younger Marvin was often suicidal and paranoid, and by now was afraid of leaving his room and spoke of little besides suicide and death. Gaye sometimes wore three overcoats and put his shoes on the wrong feet. Four days before his death, according to his sister Jeanne, Gaye had tried to kill himself by jumping out of a speeding sports car, suffering only minor bruises. Jeanne contended that "there was no doubt Marvin wanted to die" and that he "couldn't take any more."

Killing

In the days prior to his death, Gaye's parents had arguments mainly over a misplaced insurance policy letter. The day before his death, the arguments spread to Gaye's bedroom. Angered by his father confronting his mother, Gaye commanded Marvin Sr. to leave her alone; Marvin Sr. complied without incident and there was no violence that night, but Marvin Sr. continued yelling throughout the house.

At approximately 12:30 p.m. (PST; 20:30 UTC) on April 1, 1984, an impatient Marvin Sr. shouted at his wife about the document. Gaye, dressed in a maroon robe, shouted back downstairs, telling his father if he had something to say, he should do it in person. According to Alberta, when Marvin Sr. refused his son's request, Gaye warned him not to come to his room. Marvin Sr., however, instead charged upstairs to the bedroom to verbally attack Alberta over the document, causing Gaye to jump out of his bed and once again order his father out of the room. When ordering did not work, Gaye, enraged, reportedly shoved his father out of the room into the hallway then began kicking and punching him.

Alberta later told Ritz: "Marvin hit him. I shouted for him to stop, but he paid no attention to me. He gave my husband some hard kicks." Jeanne later recalled that it was understood in the family that if one of the children ever dared to strike their father that he would "murder him or her", saying her father "made it very clear" and "said so publicly on more than one occasion." Gaye reportedly followed his father to the bedroom and, according to his mother, continued to kick him brutally. Eventually, Alberta separated Gaye from his father and returned him to his bedroom.

Minutes later, at 12:38 p.m. (PST; 20:38 UTC), Marvin Sr. entered his bedroom, returning with the .38 pistol his son had earlier bought him, pointed it at Gaye and shot him directly in the heart, as Alberta later explained to police:

The first shot, which proved to be fatal, entered the right side of Gaye's chest, perforating his right lung, heart, diaphragm, liver, stomach and left kidney before coming to rest against his left flank. Marvin Sr. stepped closer after the first shot and shot him a second time at point-blank range. 

In a 2018 episode of the Reelz TV series Autopsy: The Last Hours of..., forensic pathologist Michael Hunter expressed his belief that Gaye was initially shot nonfatally in the left shoulder by his father while the two men were standing two feet apart while facing each other. Hunter believed that this first shot "penetrated the left shoulder just below the clavicle and exited his back without causing any serious injury", the impact of which caused Gaye to fall down. Hunter also believed that Gaye was then shot fatally in the chest, which "had a very damaging and odd trajectory," traveling "diagonally down through the lung, heart, diaphragm, liver, and kidney, finally embedding itself on the left side of the torso." From Hunter's point of view, "the direction of the bullet's trajectory suggests Marvin was positioned toward his father, and that his father was likely to have been moving away at the time."

Afraid of being shot next, Alberta screamed and ran out of the bedroom, all the while pleading in fear to her husband not to shoot her. According to reports, Gaye's father hid the gun underneath his pillow. In the meantime, Gaye's brother Frankie and his sister-in-law, Irene, heard the shots as they lived in a guest house on the property. After the first shot, Frankie initially thought it sounded like a car backfired. Afterwards, they heard screams from outside, rushed out, and saw Alberta who ran into Irene's arms, shouting, "He's shot Marvin. He's killed my boy."

Frankie ran to the house and carefully walked into the hallway to his brother's room, not knowing if Marvin Sr. was still armed, whether he was still in the room, or if his brother was dead. After walking into Gaye's bedroom, an emotional Frankie held him as Gaye bled rapidly. Frankie alleges that Marvin, barely speaking above a whisper, told him, "I got what I wanted... I couldn't do it myself, so I had him do it... it's good, I ran my race, there's no more left in me." After police arrived, Irene went to Marvin Sr. in his bedroom and asked him where the gun was. After searching over his bedroom, Irene located it under his pillow. Upon exiting the house, Irene dropped the gun on the lawn. Immediately following this, Marvin Sr., who had by now taken a seat on the front porch outside the house, was arrested.

The police arrived twenty minutes after the shooting. Gaye's body was taken out of the house and sent to the California Hospital Medical Center. At approximately 1:01 p.m. (PST; 21:01 UTC), Gaye was pronounced dead on arrival. He died just one day before his 45th birthday. As soon as his death was announced, several of Gaye's neighbors and onlookers paraded around the house, many in stunned shock and silence.

Autopsy and funeral

An autopsy was conducted on Gaye's body shortly after his death. Test results showed that he had elements of cocaine and PCP (or angel dust) in his system. After lawyers misread the coroner's report, Judge Ronald George determined later during preliminary hearings in the court case that PCP can often provoke violence. When told that the report had concluded only that Gaye had just cocaine traces in his system, the judge said PCP was not a major factor in his decision.

During an interview with the police, Gaye's father contended that he was scared that something would happen to him and that he only meant to shoot in self-defense, stating he did not know the gun had any bullets in it, claiming he thought there were either "blanks or BBs." When asked if he loved his son, Marvin Sr. reportedly stated in a soft voice, "Let's say I didn't dislike him." Upon being told that his son had died from the shots, Marvin Sr. reportedly wept after realizing he had killed him. Marvin Sr. was held on bond afterwards. 

Gaye's siblings believed that his death was a "premeditated suicide". Jeanne later said that upon forcing his father's hand in the murder that he had "accomplished three things. He put himself out of his misery. He brought relief to Mother by finally getting her husband out of her life. And he punished Father, by making certain that the rest of his life would be miserable... my brother knew just what he was doing."

On April 5, 1984, a star-studded funeral was held for Gaye at Forest Lawn Memorial Park, Glendale, attended by over 10,000 mourners, including his Motown colleagues; his two ex-wives, Anna Gaye and Janis Gaye; and his siblings, mother and three children. Smokey Robinson and Dick Gregory delivered eulogies, while Stevie Wonder performed "Lighting Up the Candles," which was later included on Wonder's soundtrack to the film Jungle Fever, and Cecil T. "Sesil J" Jenkins sang "The Lord's Prayer". At the open-casket funeral, Gaye was wearing one of his costumes from his final concert tour, a gold and white military style uniform, with an ermine wrap at his shoulders. The funeral was presided by the Chief Apostle of Gaye's family's old church, the House of God. Following the funeral, Gaye was given a burial plot. In accordance with the family's request, his body was cremated with half of his ashes spread near the Pacific Ocean by his three children and Anna Gaye. Anna and their adopted son, Marvin III, then kept a small portion of the ashes for themselves.

Gaye left behind no will. As a result, his son Marvin III, aged 17 at the time, became co-administrator of his estate. At the time of his death Gaye was struggling financially, as the IRS had asked for $1 million (US$ in  dollars) to pay back unpaid taxes of $600,000 (US$ in  dollars) to the State of California and back alimony of $300,000 (US$ in  dollars) to Anna and Janis Gaye. He was $1,900,000 (US$ in  dollars) in debt at the time of his death, but royalties from Gaye's work eventually paid off those debts.

Court case
Marvin Sr. was held at the Los Angeles County Jail on $100,000 bail. His accounts of the shooting were printed in the Los Angeles Herald-Examiner, quoting his words: "I didn't mean to do it."

During a check up at the County-USC Medical Center, a benign tumor was discovered at the base of Marvin Sr.'s brain. Doctors removed the tumor on May 17, 1984. On June 12, after reviewing a two-page report, including two psychiatric evaluations conducted by Ronald Markman, Judge Michael Pirosh ruled that Marvin Sr. was competent to stand trial. He appeared in court again on June 20, where he was ordered to return on July 16 for a preliminary hearing. 

Marvin Sr.'s estranged wife, Alberta, posted the reduced bail of $30,000 via a bondsman to secure the ex-minister's release from jail. Two days earlier, she had filed for divorce, citing as grounds that she had officially separated from him following their son's fatal shooting on the same day. Looking over documents, the amount of drugs in Gaye's system, and pictures of Marvin Sr.'s injuries during his final fight with his son, Judge Ronald M. George agreed to grant Marvin Sr. a plea bargain. As a result, he pleaded no contest to a voluntary manslaughter charge on September 20, 1984. On November 2, Judge Gordon Ringer sentenced Marvin Sr. to a six-year suspended sentence and five years of probation. During the sentencing hearing, Marvin Sr. tearfully told the court:

Aftermath

Reactions
News stations reported on Gaye's death almost immediately after it was announced, with one of the most prominent announcements coming from CBS anchor Dan Rather. Eulogies were delivered in American, Asian and European countries. The New York Times ran the story in its front page the day after his death.

Many of Gaye's friends and peers were initially shocked to learn of Gaye’s death. Some of them did not initially believe the news because April 1 is also April Fools' Day, a date associated with jokes and hoaxes with the media taking part in such for that day only. Otis Williams, of the Motown group The Temptations, recalled receiving the news while touring with the Four Tops in Australia and said, "It was a very dark day that I will never forget as the day I lost a friend." Former Motown staffer Janie Bradford and her husband were driving home after listening to radio all day when the announcer announced Gaye's death. CBS Urban president Larkin Arnold was also reportedly stunned with the news as he had tried to get Gaye in the studio for his follow-up to Midnight Love. Smokey Robinson heard the news of Gaye's death on the radio; feeling that his "innards wouldn't accept" the news, he called Gaye's ex-wife Anna to find out whether it was true, and she confirmed it before he could ask her, leaving Robinson in shock.

Longtime Gaye admirer and former nephew-in-law Jermaine Jackson, brother of Michael Jackson, recalled sobbing uncontrollably once he heard the news and called Barry White to confirm the story. According to White, Gaye had agreed to do a series of duets with him. Berry Gordy's ex-wife Ray Singleton received the news from Anna on the phone. Upon the arrival of her son and Gaye's adopted son, Marvin III, Singleton told Gaye III to go upstairs and talk to his mother, who then told him the news.

VH1 listed Gaye's death as the eighth most shocking moment in rock and roll. Recollections of the death from admirers of Gaye included rapper Chuck D and Al Sharpton, who noted the coincidence of the date when he replied that the death came "like a sick, sad joke to all of us." Gordy, who was overcome with emotion and grief over Gaye's death, took out full-page ads following his funeral declaring that Gaye was "the greatest of his time" and the best recording artist he ever worked with. New wave group Duran Duran dedicated their hit ballad, "Save a Prayer", to Gaye the following afternoon during a performance in Oakland, California; their performance was later taped for the videotape, Arena.

Immediately after his death, numerous fans of Gaye stood outside the house at Gramercy Place, placed memorabilia and other items on the lawn, and held vigils there, until the next day, Gaye's birthday.

Memorials and tributes

Gaye was placed on the cover of Rolling Stone for the third time in a posthumous cover in its May 10, 1984, issue. The issue discussed Gaye's personal life, his music, and his contributions to Motown and popular music.

In November 1984, Diana Ross released the tribute song, "Missing You."  It appeared on Ross' album, Swept Away, and later peaked at No. 1 on the Hot Black Singles chart and placed at No. 10 on the Billboard Hot 100.  Later, a video of the song featured classic footage of Gaye, including footage of Gaye appearing at Ross' 1982 concert in Brussels. The following January while hosting the American Music Awards, Ross led an In Memoriam tribute to stars who died in 1984 with Gaye leading the tribute.  Also in November 1984, Teena Marie released the tribute song, "My Dear Mr. Gaye" from her hit album, Starchild, the highest selling album of her career.  The Commodores issued the song "Nightshift," which was dedicated to Gaye and fellow musician Jackie Wilson, who also died in 1984. The song, featured on their album of the same name, peaked at No. 1 on the rhythm and blues chart, reached the top ten on the Hot 100, and became a hit in other countries. Todd Rundgren's song "Lost Horizon" from his A Cappella album is said to be dedicated to Gaye. Rundgren later performed a medley of Gaye's hits during concerts and sometimes added "Lost Horizon" to the medley. In 1989, soul band Frankie Beverly & Maze produced the tribute song, "Silky Soul," taking its melody from "What's Going On."  The song featured Nona Gaye in the video and later peaked at No. 5 on the R&B chart. At least two tribute albums of Gaye's have been released: 1995's Inner City Blues: The Music of Marvin Gaye and 1999's Marvin Is 60: A Tribute Album.

Starting in 1985, there have been annual Marvin Gaye Day celebrations in the city of Washington, D.C., Gaye's hometown. The day was officiated by then-mayor Marion Barry on the day of Gaye's 46th birthday. Since then, a non-profit organization has helped to organize Marvin Gaye Day celebrations in the city. In 1986, Marvin's mother Alberta founded the Marvin P. Gaye Jr. Memorial Foundation, which is dedicated to those suffering from  drug abuse and alcoholism. It opened a day after she died from complications of bone cancer in May 1987. In 1990, after years of petitions and letters, Gaye was given a star on the Hollywood Walk of Fame, with one of its most prominent letters written by longtime fan Eddie Murphy. Six years later, in 1996, Gaye posthumously received the Grammy Lifetime Achievement Award. In 2006, an old park that Gaye frequented as a teenager, the former Watts Branch Park, was renamed Marvin Gaye Park in his honor. Three years later, in 2009, the 5200 block of Foote Street NE in Deanwood, Washington, D.C., was renamed Marvin Gaye Way.

On November 20, 2018, the United States Postal Service announced that Marvin Gaye would be featured on a first class postage stamp, as part of the Postal Service's Music Icons series (past honorees include Elvis Presley and John Lennon).

References

Sources

Further reading

Marvin Gaye
1984 in California
1984 in Los Angeles
1984 in music
1984 murders in the United States
April 1984 events in the United States
Crimes in Los Angeles
Deaths by firearm in California
Deaths by person in Los Angeles
Gaye
Murder in Los Angeles
Murdered African-American people